Novedrate is a comune (municipality) in the Province of Como in the Italian region Lombardy, located about  north of Milan and about  south of Como. As of 31 December 2004, it had a population of 2,950 and an area of 2.8 km².

Geography
Novedrate borders the following municipalities: Carimate, Figino Serenza, Lentate sul Seveso and Mariano Comense. Its frazione is Villaggio San Giuseppe.

Demographic evolution

Media

The town was cited in the song 'O scarrafone (Un uomo in blues, 1991) by Pino Daniele,  as one of many places in which Southern Italians emigrate in Northern Italy.

References

External links

 Novedrate official website

Cities and towns in Lombardy